Ustad Allah Bakhsh (  18 October 1978; sometimes spelled Allah Bux or Allah Bukhsh) was a Pakistani painter and calligrapher who was actively involved in aesthetics and classical landscape paintings throughout his life. He produced his work in British India before partition and in Pakistan after split of Indian subcontinent. Most of his work revolves around traditional tales of Persian and Hindu mythology. He also depicted rural life, particularly culture of Punjab, Pakistan in his paintings.

The recipient of national literary award, the Pride of Performance in 1963, he is primarily recognized for depicting tragic love stories of Sohni Mahiwal, Heer Ranjha and Tilism-e-Hoshruba, an epic story of Amir Hamza, a legendary Persian adventurer. Sometimes, he used to depict traditional festivals of Punjab. Some of his work he produced after independence was acquired by the National Art Gallery.

Life and background 
He was born around 1895 in British India (in modern-day Wazirabad, Pakistan). He spent most of his life in Lahore. At first, he attended a Madrasa to study Urdu and Arabic, however, he subsequently left school. His father was a house painter who used to work at Mughalpura Railway Workshop.

Career 
At the apparent age of five, he joined Master Abdullah who trained him in artwork. He was first asked to practice three English alphabets (ABC) on slate. It is believed he practiced letter "A" for the first three years, and later B and C letters to produce "ABC of art". He started his first artwork between 1913 and 1914 at Bhati Gate with nonrepresentational patterns. Initially, he copied Western painting to create visual characters, but later adopted original artwork with mythical subject. In 1914, he went to Bombay (now Mumbai) for a better career where he stayed for five years and worked at Roop Naraine Photographic Studio as a background artist. His initial efforts didn't help him to earn recognition. He later created paintings of Krishna, a major deity in Hinduism which helped him to be recognized as an artist. After practicing Punjabi folklore and Hindu mythology, he became known as a "romantic painter". The newspapers of that time referred to him  as the "master painter".

He moved back to Lahore in 1919 and worked as a commercial artist at Paisa Akhbar in Urdu Bazaar (Lahore) until 1922. Later in 1924, Maharaja Hari Singh of Jammu and Kashmir offered him a job as a court-painter, but he declined the offer. He worked at the court of Bhupinder Singh of Patiala from 1937 to 1938. After he left the court, he created a landscape painting of a woman living in a village along with her kids which became one of his prominent paintings.

During the last years of his life, he lost most of his eyesight due to cataract. Many people consider him one of the pioneer artists of modern landscape and figurative painting in early years of Pakistan.

Death and legacy 
He died in Pakistan on 18 October 1978. In 1991, Pakistan Post issued a commemorative postage stamp to honor Allah Bakhsh in its 'Painters Of Pakistan' series. He died in Lahore and is buried in the Muslim town cemetery.

References 

1890s births
1978 deaths
People from Wazirabad
20th-century Pakistani painters
Recipients of the Pride of Performance